Park Ridge station could refer to:
Park Ridge station (Illinois) in Park Ridge, Illinois
Park Ridge (NJT station) in Park Ridge, New Jersey